Won by a Fish is a 1912 silent film comedy directed by Mack Sennett and starring Mary Pickford. It was produced by the Biograph Company and released as split-reel with The Brave Hunter by General Film Company.

This film exists.

Cast
Edward Dillon - Harry
Mary Pickford - The Woman
Dell Henderson - The Woman's Father
Kate Bruce - The Maid
William J. Butler- At Dinner
Grace Henderson - At Dinner
Charles Hill Mailes - At Dinner
Kate Toncray - At Dinner

continuing cast
Frank Evans - At Dinner
Florence Lee - At Dinner
W. C. Robinson - At Dinner

References

External links
  Won by a Fish at IMDb.com

1912 films
American silent short films
Films directed by Mack Sennett
Biograph Company films
American black-and-white films
1912 short films
1912 comedy films
American comedy short films
Silent American comedy films
1910s American films